Wálter Elizondo Gómez  (4 November 1942 – 20 November 2018) was a Costa Rican international footballer.

Club career
Born in El Carmen, Cartago, Elizondo started his career at Orión after coming through the Saprissa youth system. He then played as a central defender for Saprissa for most of his career and between 1964 and 1969, Elizondo won five championships with them. He also won two championships with Alajuelense, and one with Herediano. He finished his career at Cartaginés. He scored 44 goals in total in the Costa Rican premier division.

Elizondo was named one of the top 100 Costa Rican footballers of all-time in 2009 and the best of the 1970s.

International career
Elizondo appeared in 43 matches and scored 5 goals for the full Costa Rica national football team from 1963 to 1975. He has represented his country in 12 FIFA World Cup qualification matches.

Managerial career
After retiring from a playing career in 1978, Elizondo went on to manage Cartaginés and Saprissa.

Personal life
Elizondo's father, Guillermo Elizondo Gómez, was also a Costa Rican international footballer.

Elizondo suffered a stroke during March 2008.

References

External links

1942 births
2018 deaths
People from Cartago Province
Association football defenders
Costa Rican men's footballers
Costa Rica international footballers
Deportivo Saprissa players
L.D. Alajuelense footballers
C.S. Herediano footballers
C.S. Cartaginés players
CONCACAF Championship-winning players
Liga FPD players